Avicenna Scientific and Cultural Foundation is a non-profit non-governmental institution whose focus is on the life and works of the Persian polymath Abū ʿAlī al-Ḥusayn ibn ʿAbd Allāh ibn Al-Hasan ibn Ali ibn Sīnā (Avicenna or Ibn Sina). The foundation showcases his character and work, honoring his universal position, encouraging national and international researchers to produce distinguished works, as well as enhancing cultural and scientific activities.

The president of the foundation
The president of the foundation holds the highest-ranking executive post and is elected by the board of trustees as well as the order of the board of trustees' secretary for a four-year term, which can be renewed for another term.

See also 
 Avicenna
 Avicenna Mausoleum
 Philosopher
 Physician

References

External links 
 Ministry of Culture and Islamic Guidance (Iran)

Avicenna
2005 establishments in Iran
2005 in Iran
Organizations established in 2005
Non-governmental organizations